"All Your Fault" is a song recorded by American rapper Big Sean featuring fellow rap artist Kanye West, from Sean's third studio album Dark Sky Paradise. It contains samples from Ambrosia's 1978 song "How Much I Feel" and features additional vocals from Travis Scott.

Music video
On June 24, 2015, a music video was released for the track even though it wasn't released as a single and one was released for fellow album track "I Know" featuring Jhené Aiko on the same day. The video mostly consists of Sean and West performing, with video girls smoldering and it was directed by Mark Mayer and Aaron Platt.

Commercial performance
Upon the release of Dark Sky Paradise, "All Your Fault" charted at number 80 on the US Billboard Hot 100. It peaked at number 28 on the US Hot R&B/Hip-Hop Songs chart in the same week and spent a total of three weeks on the chart.

Charts

Certifications

References

2015 songs
Big Sean songs
Kanye West songs
Songs written by Big Sean
Songs written by Kanye West
Songs written by The-Dream
Songs written by David Pack
Song recordings produced by Kanye West